Karapiro was a New Zealand parliamentary electorate from 1996 to 2002.

It was in the Waikato, and was a rural and safe National seat, held first by John Luxton and then by Lindsay Tisch.

Population centres
The 1996 election was notable for the significant change of electorate boundaries, based on the provisions of the Electoral Act 1993. Because of the introduction of the mixed-member proportional (MMP) electoral system, the number of electorates had to be reduced, leading to significant changes. More than half of the electorates contested in 1996 were newly constituted, and most of the remainder had seen significant boundary changes. In total, 73 electorates were abolished, 29 electorates were newly created (including Karapiro), and 10 electorates were recreated, giving a net loss of 34 electorates.

The electorate includes the following population centres:
 Cambridge
 Matamata
 Morrinsville

History
Karapiro was created as an electorate in the first MMP general election of 1996, replacing the Matamata electorate. John Luxton won the electorate in 1996, but he stood aside in 1999 for Lindsay Tisch, and went on the party list.

In the 2002 general election it was replaced by the Piako electorate, which was won by Lindsay Tisch.

Members of Parliament
Key

Election results

1999 election
Refer to Candidates in the New Zealand general election 1999 by electorate#Karapiro for a list of candidates.

1996 election

References

Historical electorates of New Zealand
1996 establishments in New Zealand
2002 disestablishments in New Zealand